Yaron Zilberman (born October 2, 1966) is an Israeli-American director, screenwriter and producer.

Career 
Zilberman directed, co-wrote and produced A Late Quartet which starred Philip Seymour Hoffman, Christopher Walken, Catherine Keener, Mark Ivanir and Imogen Poots. The film premiered in the Special Presentation program at the 2012 Toronto International Film Festival. Inspired by and structured around Beethoven's Opus 131, the film follows the world-renowned Fugue String Quartet after its cellist Peter Mitchell (Christopher Walken) is diagnosed with Parkinson’s Disease.  Cinematographer Frederick Elmes lensed the film and composer Angelo Badalamenti composed the score for the film. The Brentano String Quartet played the quartet music for the soundtrack and Anne Sofie von Otter appears as the cellist's late wife, singing Korngold's "Marietta's Song" from Die tote Stadt.  The film was theatrically released in over 30 countries and was critically acclaimed. It was a New York Times Critics Pick. Rolling Stone’s Peter Travers called it “a shining gem of a movie” and Roger Ebert said “it does one of the most interesting things any film can do. It shows how skilled professionals work.”

Zilberman made his directorial debut with his theatrical feature documentary Watermarks (2004), which follows the champion women swimmers of Hakoah Vienna as they reunite at their old swimming pool 65 years after they were forced by the Nazis to flee Austria. Watermarks won nine film festival awards and enjoyed a successful theatrical run internationally.

Personal life 
Zilberman lives in New York City with his wife, producer Tamar Sela, and their children.

He is a graduate of the Massachusetts Institute of Technology (MIT).

Filmography

Director 
 Watermarks (2004)
 A Late Quartet (2012)
 Incitement (2019)
Valley of Tears (TV Series) (2020)

Writer 
 Watermarks (2004)
A Late Quartet (2012)

Producer 
 Watermarks (2004)
 A Late Quartet (2012)

References

External links 
 

American people of Israeli descent
American directors
American screenwriters
American producers
1966 births
Living people